Plum Blossom (lit. "Youth") is a 2000 South Korean coming-of-age film written and directed by Kwak Ji-kyoon.

Plot 

Kim Ja-hyo, a teenage boy, moves to a new high school in his senior year. His classmate Jeong Ha-ra seduces him, and he loses his virginity with her. Afterwards, he becomes frightened when Ha-ra obsessively declares her love for him, so he begins to avoid her. Devastated by his indifference, Ha-ra commits suicide in front of the whole school. Since then, though Ja-hyo sleeps around in college, he is unable to form lasting attachments with women. Until he meets perky nurse Seo Nam-ok.

Meanwhile, Ja-hyo's best friend Lee Su-in develops a crush on the new teacher, Yun Jeong-hye. She unwillingly rejects him because a student-teacher relationship is socially taboo. Heartbroken, Su-in gets involved with an older woman in college, but continues to pine after Jeong-hye, sending her countless letters. To get closure, he hopes to see her face-to-face one last time.

Cast 
Kim Rae-won as Kim Ja-hyo
Kim Jung-hyun as Lee Su-in
Jin Hee-kyung as Yun Jeong-hye
Bae Doona as Seo Nam-ok
Yoon Ji-hye as Jeong Ha-ra
Kim Jae-young as Seo Wan-jae
Ham Shin-young as Ha Jeong-tae
Park Chan-im as Oh Dal-sun
Lee Yong-nyeo as Ha-ra's mother 
Jo Han-hee as Su-in's mother
Go Doo-shim as Nam-ok's mother
Lee Yoon-geon as Homeroom teacher
Lee Chun-woo as Drunk
Ham Sun-ho as Professor

References

External links 

South Korean erotic films
South Korean coming-of-age films
2000s erotic films
2000 films
Films directed by Kwak Ji-kyoon
2000s South Korean films